The 2002 MTV Movie Awards were presented on June 6, 2002, hosted by Sarah Michelle Gellar and Jack Black, and featured performances by The White Stripes, Kelly Osbourne and Eminem.
It was the 11th Annual MTV Movie Awards. This year, MTV added four new award categories, but their winners didn't appear in the TV Show: "Favorite Line", "Best Cameo", "Best Dressed" and "Best Music Moment". 
The "Best Song" (or "Best Musical Performance") category disappeared, and the "Best Dance Sequence" category returned.
"Best On-Screen Duo" became "Best On-Screen Team".

Performers
 Jack Black & Sarah Michelle Gellar – "Movies Kick Ass"
 The White Stripes – "Fell in Love with a Girl" / "Dead Leaves and the Dirty Ground"
 Eminem (featuring Proof and Ryan Shepard) – "Without Me"
 Kelly Osbourne – "Papa Don't Preach"

Presenters
 Jennifer Garner and Charlize Theron — presented Best Male Performance
 Linda Cardellini, Matthew Lillard, and Freddie Prinze, Jr. — presented Best Kiss
 Kate Beckinsale and Nicolas Cage — presented Best Action Sequence
 Vin Diesel and Eve — presented Breakthrough Female
 Jack Black — introduced The White Stripes
 Bow Wow and Katie Holmes — presented Best Villain
 Johnny Knoxville and Will Smith — presented Best Musical Sequence
 Chris Rock — introduced Eminem
 Matt Damon and Franka Potente — presented Best Fight
 Hilary Swank — presented Best New Filmmaker
 Brittany Murphy and Eddie Griffin — presented Breakthrough Male
 Ben Affleck and Bridget Moynahan — presented Best Comedic Performance
 Ozzy Osbourne — introduced Kelly Osbourne
 Adam Sandler and Winona Ryder — presented Best On-Screen Team
 Natalie Portman and Ewan McGregor — presented Best Female Performance
 Mike Myers — presented Best Movie

Awards

Best Movie
The Lord of the Rings: The Fellowship of the Ring
 Black Hawk Down
 The Fast and the Furious
 Legally Blonde
 Shrek

Best Male Performance
Will Smith – Ali
 Russell Crowe – A Beautiful Mind
 Vin Diesel – The Fast and the Furious
 Josh Hartnett – Pearl Harbor
 Elijah Wood – The Lord of the Rings: The Fellowship of the Ring

Best Female Performance
Nicole Kidman – Moulin Rouge!
 Kate Beckinsale – Pearl Harbor
 Halle Berry – Monster's Ball
 Angelina Jolie – Lara Croft: Tomb Raider
 Reese Witherspoon – Legally Blonde

Breakthrough Male
Orlando Bloom – The Lord of the Rings: The Fellowship of the Ring
 DMX – Exit Wounds
 Colin Hanks – Orange County
 Daniel Radcliffe – Harry Potter and the Sorcerer's Stone
 Paul Walker – The Fast and the Furious

Breakthrough Female
Mandy Moore – A Walk to Remember
 Penélope Cruz – Blow
 Anne Hathaway – The Princess Diaries
 Shannyn Sossamon – A Knight's Tale
 Britney Spears – Crossroads

Best On-Screen Team
Vin Diesel and Paul Walker – The Fast and the Furious
 Casey Affleck, Scott Caan, Don Cheadle, George Clooney, Matt Damon, Elliott Gould, Eddie Jemison, Bernie Mac, Brad Pitt, Shaobo Qin and Carl Reiner – Ocean's Eleven
 Jackie Chan and Chris Tucker – Rush Hour 2
 Cameron Diaz, Eddie Murphy and Mike Myers – Shrek
 Ben Stiller and Owen Wilson – Zoolander

Best Villain
Denzel Washington – Training Day
 Aaliyah – Queen of the Damned
 Christopher Lee – The Lord of the Rings: The Fellowship of the Ring
 Tim Roth – Planet of the Apes
 Zhang Ziyi – Rush Hour 2

Best Comedic Performance
Reese Witherspoon – Legally Blonde
 Eddie Murphy – Shrek
 Mike Myers – Shrek
 Seann William Scott – American Pie 2
 Chris Tucker – Rush Hour 2

Best Kiss
Jason Biggs and Seann William Scott – American Pie 2
 Nicole Kidman and Ewan McGregor – Moulin Rouge!
 Mia Kirshner and Beverly Polcyn – Not Another Teen Movie
 Heath Ledger and Shannyn Sossamon – A Knight's Tale
 Renée Zellweger and Colin Firth – Bridget Jones's Diary

Best Action Sequence
The Attack Scene – Pearl Harbor
 First Helicopter Crash – Black Hawk Down
 The Final Race – The Fast and the Furious
 The Cave Tomb Battle – The Lord of the Rings: The Fellowship of the Ring

Best Musical Sequence
Nicole Kidman and Ewan McGregor — "Elephant Love Medley" (from Moulin Rouge!)
 Heath Ledger and Shannyn Sossamon — "Golden Years" (from A Knight's Tale)
 Chris Tucker — "Don't Stop 'Til You Get Enough" (from Rush Hour 2)
 Nicole Kidman — "Sparkling Diamonds" (from Moulin Rouge!)

Best Fight
Jackie Chan and Chris Tucker vs. Hong Kong Gang – Rush Hour 2
 Angelina Jolie vs. Robot – Lara Croft: Tomb Raider
 Christopher Lee vs. Ian McKellen – The Lord of the Rings: The Fellowship of the Ring
 Jet Li vs. Himself – The One

Best Line
"Oh, I Like your Outfit Too, Except When I Dress Up As a Frigid Bitch, I Try Not to Look so Constipated" — Reese Witherspoon (from Legally Blonde)
 "King Kong ain't got nothin' on me!" — Denzel Washington (from Training Day)
 "Oh, It's Already Been Brought!" — Jaime Pressly (from Not Another Teen Movie)
 "There's More to Life than Just Being Really, Really, Really Ridicuously Good Looking" — Ben Stiller (from Zoolander)   
 "We Graduated High School. How Totally Amazing" — Thora Birch (from Ghost World)
 "Yeah, I Kind of Super Glued Myself, to, uh, Myself" — Jason Biggs (from American Pie 2)

Best Cameo
Snoop Dogg – Training Day
 Charlton Heston – Planet of the Apes
 David Bowie – Zoolander
 Dustin Diamond – Made
 Kylie Minogue – Moulin Rouge!
 Molly Ringwald – Not Another Teen Movie

Best Dressed
Reese Witherspoon – Legally Blonde
 Britney Spears – Crossroads
 Thora Birch – Ghost World
 George Clooney – Ocean's Eleven
 Will Ferrell – Zoolander
 Ben Stiller – Zoolander

Best New Filmmaker
 Christopher Nolan – Memento

References

External links
 2002 MTV Movie Awards  on IMDb

 2002
Mtv Movie Awards
MTV Movie Awards
2002 in Los Angeles
2002 in American cinema